Hotel Porta Fira (also Torres de Toyo Ito with Torre Realia BCN) is a 28-storey,  skyscraper hotel designed by Toyo Ito on the Plaza de Europa in the district of Granvia l'Hospitalet in L'Hospitalet de Llobregat, a suburb of Barcelona, Catalonia, Spain. The building was the 2010 first-place winner of the Emporis Skyscraper Award.

See also 

 List of tallest buildings and structures in Barcelona

References

External links
 

Hotel buildings completed in 2010
Skyscraper hotels in Barcelona
Toyo Ito buildings

sk:Torres de Toyo Ito